Fayette P. Arnold was a member of the Wisconsin State Assembly.

Arnold was born near Hubbardton, Vermont, the date seems to be disputed. In 1850, he moved to Sharon, Walworth County, Wisconsin. He died on January 9, 1872. Arnold's son, Cassius, later became Town Treasurer of Sharon.

Career
Arnold was a member of the Assembly during the 1862 session. In addition, he was a member of the county board of Walworth County, Wisconsin. He was a Republican.

References

People from Hubbardton, Vermont
People from Sharon, Wisconsin
County supervisors in Wisconsin
Republican Party members of the Wisconsin State Assembly
1872 deaths
Year of birth uncertain